Qaedi-ye Seh (also Romanized as Qā’edī-ye Seh; also known as Chāh Qā’edī, Maḩalleh-ye Qā’edī, Qā’edī, Qāyed, and Qāyedī) is a village in Sigar Rural District, in the Central District of Lamerd County, Fars Province, Iran. At the 2006 census, its population was 89, in 20 families.

References 

Populated places in Lamerd County